Casuarictin is an ellagitannin, a type of hydrolysable tannin. It can be found in Casuarina and Stachyurus species.

It is formed from two hexahydroxydiphenic acid units and one gallic acid unit linked to a glucose molecule.

The molecule is formed from tellimagrandin II, itself formed from pentagalloyl glucose via oxidation. Casuarictin is transformed into pedunculagin via loss of a gallate group, and further into castalagin via glucose pyranose ring opening.

Oligomers 
Sanguiin H-6 is a dimer, Lambertianin C is trimer and lambertianin D is a tetramer of casuarictin.

References 

Ellagitannins
Lactones